The Solidarity Party (Hizb Al-Tadamon Al-Lubnany; Arabic:حزب التضامن اللبناني) is a Lebanese political party established and led by Emile Rahme and part of the March 8 Alliance. It had one seat in the 2009 Lebanese elections.

Emile Gorges Rahme was born on March 1, 1952, in Deir El Ahmar and attended Sharkieh School in Zahle. Since childhood, Rahme was distinguished by an instinctive tendency to politics, so he enrolled into the Lebanese University and graduated with a master's degree in Personal Rights field.

Rahme began early his reforming political life, so he presided in 1975, during his last academic year, "The Awakening Movement" (Harakat Al Wa’ai), a student movement calling for student rights and equality among them. Ten years later, Rahme established "Solidarity Party" (Hizb el-Tadamon) that he still presides till nowadays.

In 1986, Rahme was the official legal representative of the Lebanese Forces, and defended in 1994 their leader Samir Geagea and Mr. Fouad Malek in addition to all Lebanese Forces members before justice after being arrested.

Since the beginning of his political life, Emile Rahme was known for his commitment and dedication. In 1982, he attended the Christian Democratic International in the Belgian and Italian Parliaments. In 1986 and till now, he is an active member in the Maronite Union. Furthermore, he was present at the Maronite Congress in Canada in 1985, in New York in 1989, and in Los Angeles in 1994 and 2002. Rahme is also considered an active member in the National Christian Union Committee since 2008. Finally, he was elected in 2003 "Coordinator of Lebanese Parties to support the Palestinian Right of Return and refusal of Resettlement".

Emile Rahme, who was in 2000 an external candidate in Bsharri District, was elected deputy for the Maronite seat of Baalbeck-Hermel District in 2009.

References

 Jean-Marc Aractingi, La Politique à mes trousses, Editions l'Harmattan, Paris, 2006, Lebanon Chapter. 

Catholic political parties
Christian political parties in Lebanon
March 8 Alliance
Political parties in Lebanon
Lebanese Maronites